Dennis Souza de Guedes, known as simply Dennis Souza (born 9 January 1980) is a former Brazilian footballer. 

Souza was signed by Barnsley in August 2007 following a trial with the club. He quickly became a fixture a centre-back, and an instant favourite with the Oakwell fans. He scored two goals for Barnsley in the league, both against promotion challengers Bristol City. He also played in the memorable victories over Premier League sides Liverpool and Chelsea in the 2007-08 FA Cup.

On July 1, 2009, Souza signed for Qatari outfit Al-Sailiya Sports club on a two-year contract. After his contract was terminated, he joined Doncaster Rovers as a free agent on November 9, 2010. He was released from the club on May 20, 2011.

On 31 August 2011, he joined Super League Greece side OFI Crete on a two-year contract. On 30 June 2013, after a quick negotiation, Souza decided not to renew his contract with Ofi Crete and is at the moment free agent.

References

External links
Dennis Souza profile at barnsleyfc.co.uk

1980 births
Living people
Association football defenders
Brazilian footballers
Brazilian expatriate footballers
Expatriate footballers in the Netherlands
Expatriate footballers in Belgium
Expatriate footballers in England
Expatriate footballers in Greece
Roda JC Kerkrade players
R.A.E.C. Mons players
Standard Liège players
R. Charleroi S.C. players
Barnsley F.C. players
OFI Crete F.C. players
Belgian Pro League players
Super League Greece players
English Football League players
Footballers from São Paulo
Al-Sailiya SC players
Qatar Stars League players
K.R.C. Zuid-West-Vlaanderen players